Pterostegia is a monotypic plant genus containing only the single species Pterostegia drymarioides, which is known as the woodland threadstem, woodland pterostegia, fairy mist, or fairy bowties.

Distribution
The plant is native to the western United States, California, Baja California, and Northwestern Mexico. The plant is most commonly found carpeting the ground in shady areas, such as in the understory of a cool forest or chaparral woodlands. It sometimes grows hidden from view beneath other plants. It also is found in shaded areas of desert habitats.

Description
Pterostegia drymarioides is a very small annual spreading or climbing plant with very thin, hairy stems. The tiny leaves are lobed or heart-shaped and may be green or pink. The plant may sprawl across the ground in a thin layer or may form small patches here and there.

The plant bears tiny bright pink flowers.

References

External links
 Jepson Manual Treatment of Pterostegia drymarioides
 USDA Plants Profile for Pterostegia drymarioides (woodland pterostegia)
 Pterostegia drymarioides — Photo gallery

Monotypic Polygonaceae genera
Flora of Arizona
Flora of Baja California
Flora of California
Flora of Nevada
Flora of New Mexico
Flora of Northwestern Mexico
Flora of Oregon
Flora of Utah
Flora of the California desert regions
Flora of the Cascade Range
Flora of the Klamath Mountains
Flora of the Sierra Nevada (United States)
Flora of the Sonoran Deserts
Natural history of the California chaparral and woodlands
Natural history of the California Coast Ranges
Natural history of the Central Valley (California)
Natural history of the Channel Islands of California
Natural history of the Colorado Desert
Natural history of the Mojave Desert
Natural history of the Peninsular Ranges
Natural history of the San Francisco Bay Area
Natural history of the Santa Monica Mountains
Natural history of the Transverse Ranges
Flora without expected TNC conservation status